Rasmus Alm (born 17 August 1995) is a Swedish footballer who plays for St. Louis City SC.

Career
Alm started his career with Borstahusens BK before moving to IK Wormo at the age of 14 and later Landskrona BoIS.

References

Swedish footballers
1995 births
Living people
Allsvenskan players
Superettan players
Landskrona BoIS players
IF Brommapojkarna players
Degerfors IF players
IF Elfsborg players
Association football midfielders
People from Landskrona Municipality
Footballers from Skåne County